Charterhouse Group is private equity firm focused on leveraged buyout investments in the US.

The firm, which is based in New York City, was founded in 1973 and is one of the oldest buyout firms in the US.  Since inception, the firm has raised more than $2 billion of capital from institutional investors across six private equity funds and has invested in over 100 companies.

History
Charterhouse Group was founded in 1973 as the US-based investment arm of the British investment bank Charterhouse Bank. In the 1980s Charterhouse Group completed a spinoff from its parent bank and became an independent investment firm.  In 1989, the firm raised its first private equity fund, Charterhouse Equity Partners, with outside investors.  Between 1989 and 2005 the Charterhouse Group invested more than $2 billion in at more than 100 companies and completed some 400 acquisitions.

In 2012 Bloomberg reported that CharterHouse Group had called off fundraising for new fund pools to focus on "deal by deal" investments.  The firm's last fund closed in 2005.

In June 2014 CharterHouse Group sold its interest in TierPoint, a data center service provider.

Among Charterhouse's most notable investments, since its founding in the 1970s, are Dreyer's Grand Ice Cream Holdings, Cencom Cable Television, Charter Communications, Cornell Companies, Del Monte Corporation, Fleer Corporation, Insignia Financial Group, Lason, Amerifit Brands, Suddenlink Communications and MXenergy.

References

External links
Charterhouse Equity Advisors (U.S. private equity arm)
CharterHouse Bank (U.K. parent company)

Private equity firms of the United States
Companies based in New York City
Financial services companies established in 1973
1973 establishments in New York City